Leland Hickman (September 15, 1934 – May 12, 1991) was an American poet, editor, actor, and literary magazine publisher. During his lifetime, Hickman was best known as the publisher and editor of the influential magazine Temblor which was noted for the publication of many east and west coast language-related poets. His editorial and publishing activities brought the work of many established and emerging poets into the public view. Hickman has steadily gained posthumous recognition and fame for his poetry.

Life and work

Early years
Hickman was born in Santa Barbara, California. He lived with his family in Bakersfield from 1937 to 1945. He attended Santa Barbara College, now University of California, Santa Barbara, and later studied at the University of California, Berkeley, where he played with the Berkeley Drama Guild.

After a tour in the Army, Hickman moved to New York City to continue his career in theater. In 1960 he returned to California to play at the Equity Library Theatre West in Los Angeles. After stints in New York City and San Francisco, Hickman settled permanently in Los Angeles with his partner, the actor Charles Macaulay.

Literary career
His literary career began in the middle 1960s with the publication of the poem "Lee Sr Falls to the Floor" in The Hudson Review.  A book-length section of his serial poem, "Tiresias", entitled "Tiresias, Great Slave Lake Suite", was published by Momentum Press in 1980. It was named a finalist for the Los Angeles Times Book Award in Poetry.

A second book, Lee Sr Falls to the Floor (which collected early poems and several sections of "Tiresias"), was published posthumously by Jahbone Press in 1991.

Publishing career
Hickman worked as a poetry editor for the Los Angeles literary magazine Bachy, published by Papa Bach Bookstore, from 1977 to the spring of 1981. He edited issues nine to eighteen.

In 1981, he co-founded with Paul Vangelisti the magazine Boxcar: A Magazine of the Arts. The magazine ran for two issues.

In 1985, Hickman began publishing and editing Temblor, which continued for ten issues.

Death
Hickman died in Los Angeles of AIDS-related causes. He was 56 years old.

Selected publications
Tiresias: The Collected Poems of Leland Hickman, edited by Stephen Motika (Preface by Dennis Phillips and Afterwords by Bill Mohr), Nightboat Books, 2009.

Suggested further reading

References

External links
Tribute to Leland Hickman links to this tribute sponsored by the Poetry Center, San Francisco State University on February 6, 2010. The event featured readers including: Todd Baron, Beverly Dahlen, Kathleen Fraser, Larry Kearney, Kevin Killian, Bill Mohr, Laura Moriarty
Leland Hickman’s Tiresias: The Collected Poems poet Pierre Joris features Hickman on his blog in January 2010 to highlight a "Reading for Leland Hickman’s Tiresias: The Collected Poems which was held Jan. 13, 2010 at The Poetry Project @ St. Marks Church, NYC
Cd Shed Rage Shd Love Come a review of Hickman's Collected Poems by Kevin Killian, featured at Amazon.com
Nightboat Publisher's page publisher of Tiresias: The Collected Poems, this site has information on Hickman's life and poetry, and updates on current events related to Hickman's resurgence
The Register of Leland Hickman Papers 1950 - 1991 these are housed at the Mandeville Special Collections Library, Geisel Library, University of California, San Diego
 Self & the Poem: Lee Hickman this is an excerpt from a 1984 letter from Lee Hickman to Todd Baron and was first read by Todd Baron at the recent "Tribute to Leland Hickman" (link in list above). According to Robin Tremblay-McGaw, this letter concerns Hickman's engagement with the question/problem of the "self" in poetry

1934 births
1991 deaths
American magazine editors
American magazine founders
Language poets
AIDS-related deaths in California
Male actors from California
University of California, Santa Barbara alumni
University of California, Berkeley alumni
Writers from Santa Barbara, California
20th-century American male actors
20th-century American poets
20th-century American non-fiction writers